Timothy O'Rourke was an American football player and coach.  He served as the co-head football coach at Villanova College (now known as Villanova University) in 1902 with Richard Kelly, compiling a record of 4–3. He was captain of the 1902 Villanova Wildcats football team.

Head coaching record

References

Year of birth uncertain
Year of death uncertain
19th-century players of American football
Villanova Wildcats football coaches
Villanova Wildcats football players